Anders Sveaas (November 27 1840 – August 24 1917) was a Norwegian businessperson and consulate. He was the founder of the Kistefos Wood Pulp Mill  in Jevnaker, Norway.

Biography
Anders Sveaas was born on November 27th, 1840 on the Haug farm in Modum.
Sveaas was involved in a number of foreign ventures before founding the Kistefos pulp mill (Kistefos Træsliberi) at Kistefossen on the Randselva near Jevnaker in Oppland, Norway.  Kistefossen is located just below the end of the Randsfjord where the Randselva river forms a boundary between Jevnaker in Oppland and Ringerike in Buskerud. Sveaas had bought the Kistefossen waterfall the year before production at the pulp mill started in 1890.

The succession of this business venture,  Kistefos  is a private investment company wholly owned  by his grandson Christen Sveaas. The former site of Kistefos Træsliberi is now the location of Kistefos-Museet which was  established in 1996.

References

External links
Kistefos- Musett website

1840 births
1917 deaths
Norwegian company founders
People from  Modum